Argentina competed at the 2010 Winter Olympics in Vancouver, British Columbia, Canada.

Alpine skiing 

Argentina has qualified five entrants in alpine skiing.

Men

Women

Cross-country skiing 

Argentina has qualified one entrant in cross-country skiing.

Luge 

Argentina has qualified one entrant in luge.

See also
 Argentina at the Olympics
 Argentina at the 2010 Winter Paralympics

References

Nations at the 2010 Winter Olympics
2010
Olympics